The 2022–23 season is Glenavon's 103rd season in the top flight of the Northern Ireland Football League having been relegated in the 2003-04 season. In addition to the domestic league, they will also compete in the Irish Cup, the League Cup and the Mid-Ulster Cup in which Glenavon F.C. have won a record 27 times.

Pre-season and friendlies 
Glenavon played several pre-season friendlies including one against Bangor F.C. which resulted in a ten goal thriller. Glenavon F.C. won the match 7-3. Their main results are shown in the table below.

Competitions

Overall Record

Transfers

In

Out

Out on loan

References 

Glenavon F.C. seasons
Glenavon